The Hahoe Folk Village (Korean: 안동하회마을) is a traditional village from the Joseon Dynasty, located in Andong, Gyeongsangbuk-do, South Korea. The 'Ha' is short for river and 'hoe' means to 'turn around, return, come back. 

The village is a valuable part of Korean culture because it preserves Joseon period-style architecture, folk traditions, valuable books, and an old tradition of clan-based villages. It is listed by the South Korean government with UNESCO as a World Heritage Site with Yangdong Folk Village in 2010 and attract around 1 million visitors every year.

Overview 
Founded in the 14th-15th century, Hahoe is one of the most representative historic clan village in South Korea, together with Yangdong. The settlement include residences of head families and clan members, pavilions, Confucian academies and study pavilions that reflect the aristocratic Confuncian culture of the early Joseon. Within the village, six houses out of 124 have been designated as National Treasures. 

To the north of the village is Buyongdae Cliff while Mt. Namsan lies to the south. The village is organized around the geomantic guidelines of pungsu (Korean feng shui) and so the village has the shape of a lotus flower or two interlocking comma shapes.

History
The Ryu (or Yu in some transcriptions) clan of Pungsan established the Hahoe Folk Village in the 15th century during the Joseon Dynasty and has been a one-clan community since that time. The village is notable because it has preserved many of its original structures, such as the village Confucian school and other buildings, and maintains folk arts such as the Hahoe Mask Dance Drama ('Byeonlsin-gut') which is a shamanist rite honoring the communal spirits of the village.  

The village today is divided into Namchon (South Village) and Pukchon (North Village) with the main branch of the Pungsan Ryu clan, the Gyeomampa, in the Namchon side and the secondary branch, the Seoaepa, descended from Ryu Seong-ryong a noted prime minister during the reign of King Seonjo of Joseon in the Bukchon side. The north village contains Yangjindang Manor, designated as Treasure No. 306, and Pikchondaek House, designated Important Folklore Material No. 84. The south village contains Chunghyodang Manor, designated as Treasure No. 414 and Namchondaek House, an Important Folklore Material No. 90.  While each branch of the Pungsan Ryu clan used lived in their respective manor homes and sides, today both branches live throughout the village.

The village maintains old architectural styles that have been lost because of rapid modernization and development in South Korea. Aristocratic tile-roofed residences and thatched-roof servants' homes preserve the architectural styles of the Joseon Dynasty. Wonjijeongsa Pavilion and Byeongsan Confucian School are two notable structures in the village. The village has preserved the shamanist rite of Byeolsin-gut and preserved Hahoe masks used in the Hahoe Mask Dance. Another rite still practiced is the Jeulbul Nori which uses strings of fireworks fired at the base of the Buyongdae Cliff. Yongmogak Shrine houses Ryu Seong-ryong's collection of books and includes South Korean National Treasure No. 132, the Jingbirok, a book which records the Imjin War of Korea in 1592. Treasure No. 160, Kunmundungok, is a record of the military encampments.  Chunghyodang also holds 231 royal writs of appointment.

Inside the village there is a 650-year-okd zelkova tree called Samsindan said to be home to the goddes Samsin, in Korean Shamanism. Visitors write their wishes in pieces of paper and hang them next to the tree.

Queen Elizabeth II visited Hahoe Village in 1999. During her visit, locals in the village prepared a party to celebrate her 73rd birthday.

Intangible cultural asset

Hahoe Byeolsingut Mask Play 
The mask play, which has been played in Hahoe-ri, Pungcheon-myeon, Andong City, North Gyeongsang Province, is National Intangible Cultural Festival No. 69. The origin of this mask play is Seonangje's mask dance, which is an involuntary dramatic victory observed in Dongje, unlike Sandae Myeonghwajeon, a Korean traditional mask play. Byeolsingut Tal Nori is a mask play that is included in the overall village rite, and is a mixture of ritual, folk opera and pantomime.

Sunyu Line Fire 
'Sunyu Line Fire' is a folk game in which people hang a bag filled with charcoal powder on a long string hanging in the air and enjoy a spectacular event in which flames come on fire. In Andong's Hahoe Village, the aristocrats went boating together with a poem and a song under the full moon in July. At this time, he enjoyed pouring oil on egg shells or buppy pieces and flying them with a wick, or dropping pine tree stems that had been lit on Buyongdae.

Tourism 
Hahoe Folk Village is listed as a world heritage since 2010 and attract more than 1 million visitors per year. 

Since 2021, tour carts have been blocked to enter the site in order to preserve the village.

Gallery

See also 

 Yandong Folk Village, Gyeongju.

References

External links 

 Andong Hahoe Folk Village

Joseon dynasty
Korean culture
Andong
Folk villages in South Korea
World Heritage Sites in South Korea
Tourist attractions in North Gyeongsang Province
Important Folklore Cultural Properties of South Korea